The Babysitter: Killer Queen is a 2020 American black comedy horror film directed and produced by McG, from a screenplay he wrote with Dan Lagana, Brad Morris, and Jimmy Warden. It is a sequel to the 2017 film The Babysitter and stars Judah Lewis, Emily Alyn Lind, Jenna Ortega, Robbie Amell, Andrew Bachelor, Leslie Bibb, Hana Mae Lee, Bella Thorne, Samara Weaving, and Ken Marino. The film continues the story of Cole Johnson, two years after the events of the first film, who must again fight to ensure his survival after a secret is unburied, as he is hunted by demonic enemies, both old and new.

The film was released on September 10, 2020 on Netflix, receiving generally negative reviews from critics. A third film is in development.

Plot
Two years after a satanic cult led by his former babysitter, Bee, tried to kill him, Cole Johnson is a junior in high school. He is unable to convince anyone, except for his best friend Melanie, of Bee's life-threatening plot; his parents and most others think he had a psychotic break. After he discovers that his parents have enrolled him in a psychiatric school, he escapes with Melanie, her new boyfriend, Jimmy, and their friends Boom-Boom and Diego to join a lake party.

At the party, Cole witnesses the arrival of new student Phoebe Atwell at the lake after finding a stuffed toy and directions to the lake. Later, Cole's friends play a party game on a boat when Melanie suddenly kills Boom-Boom with a boathook and saves her blood. Melanie, Jimmy and Diego are revealed as cult members. With Boom-Boom's blood as a sacrifice, they need Cole's blood as an offering of an "innocent" to make their wishes come true. Original cultists Sonya, Allison, Max, and John also appear, having been resurrected so they could partake in the ritual by sunrise. However, Phoebe suddenly appears, looking for gas for her jet ski, and provides Cole with some time to evade the cult members and escape with Phoebe on her jet ski.

Once on land, Cole explains everything to Phoebe, who believes him, while the cultists give chase. Sonya makes the first attempt to kill them, but they end up running her over with a car left by a stranger and decapitate her with a surfboard. The cult gets into an argument after finding Sonya's body, and split up into two groups, (Allison, Max and John and Melanie, Jimmy and Diego). Max and John leave while Allison takes a break. She finds them, but the two trap her between a narrow wedge of rocks and rip her head off. The two board a boat and drive off, but Max catches the raft attached to the back of the boat and is able to pull himself onto the boat. However, Phoebe sets him on fire with a can of silly string and a lighter, then Cole shreds him with the boat's propeller. Diego and Jimmy supernaturally disintegrate when they attempt to back off from their pursuit of Cole.

Cole and Phoebe arrive at Phoebe's old family cabin, where they take refuge and hope to wait out the night. In the cabin bunker, Phoebe reveals to Cole that her parents died because she crashed into them in a fatal car accident. Cole comforts her, and the two have sex. Melanie calls Cole's father Archie, who has been searching for him alongside Melanie's father Juan, and fakes being drunk so that he can pick them up, hoping to lure Cole out. Cole and Phoebe come out of the bunker armed with crossbows and John accidentally kills himself when a chandelier crashes on him. Archie gives Cole a sleeping drug so he can take him to his car as Melanie kills Juan with a machete and captures Phoebe.

While stopping for gas, Cole regains consciousness, locks Archie out of the car, and drives back to the lake to save Phoebe. In a cove, Melanie holds Phoebe hostage before Cole shows up and volunteers to be sacrificed. Bee emerges from the water and is revealed to be Phoebe's babysitter who was responsible for the car accident that killed her parents. She made a deal with the devil to save Phoebe's life in exchange for her soul. Sonya, Allison, Max, and John are resurrected again, and the four and Melanie drink the blood of Cole mixed with Boom-Boom's blood. However, since Cole has had sex with Phoebe, the ritual backfires and the five melt and disintegrate. Bee, who did not drink the blood, reveals that she orchestrated everything so that Phoebe and Cole could unite and defeat the cult, having had a change of heart after Cole's love confession after her initial defeat. However, since Bee is still technically a demon, she drinks the blood and disintegrates to save the two. Archie shows up and, having witnessed Bee's death, now believes what Cole said was true. As the sun comes up, Cole and Phoebe embrace in a kiss, while Archie looks on proudly.

Cast

Production

Development
In September 2019, it was announced Judah Lewis, Hana Mae Lee, Robbie Amell, Bella Thorne, Andrew Bachelor, Emily Alyn Lind, Leslie Bibb and Ken Marino would reprise their roles from the first film in the sequel, with McG directing from a screenplay by McG, Dan Lagana, Brad Morris and Jimmy Warden, and Wonderland Sound and Vision and Boies/Schiller Film Group co-financing and producing. McG described the story as being based on Faust but with ridiculous jokes like in a Mel Brooks film. In October 2019, Jenna Ortega joined the cast in one of the lead roles.

The corduroy suit worn by Lewis is an homage to Wes Anderson.

Filming
Principal photography took place on location in Los Angeles, California, in 2019.

Music
Bear McCreary composed the score for the film.

Release
The film was released on Netflix on September 10, 2020. In its debut weekend, the film was the second-most watched item on Netflix.

Reception

Early reviews for The Babysitter: Killer Queen were "leaning negative", with critics calling the film "uninspired" and "embarrassing".

On Metacritic, it has a weighted average score of 22 out of 100, based on reviews from 6 critics, indicating "generally unfavorable reviews".

Dennis Harvey of Variety wrote: "Fans of the original will no doubt tune-in expecting more high-grade guilty-pleasure fun, only to get way too much of a no-longer-very-good thing instead."

Felix Vasquez Jr. of Cinema Crazed called it "flawed but a lot of fun, and has a good time with its gore and grue as the original did".

David Gelmini of Dread Central awarded it a score of 4.5 out of 5, calling it a "worthy sequel with a decent amount of gore and suspense", and praising the performances of the lead actors.

Sequel
In September 2020, McG stated that he had plans for a third and final film to conclude the series, stating that it would depend on the success of Killer Queen.

References

External links
 
 

2020 films
2020 comedy horror films
2020 black comedy films
2020s high school films
2020s slasher films
2020s teen comedy films
2020s teen horror films
American black comedy films
American comedy horror films
American high school films
American sequel films
American slasher films
American teen comedy films
American teen horror films
2020s English-language films
English-language Netflix original films
Films about bullying
Films about cults
Films about Satanism
Films directed by McG
Films shot in Los Angeles
Resurrection in film
Slasher comedy films
Wonderland Sound and Vision films
Films scored by Bear McCreary
Films produced by McG
Films produced by Mary Viola
Films produced by Zack Schiller
Films with screenplays by Dan Lagana
Films with screenplays by Brad Morris
Films with screenplays by Jimmy Warden
Films with screenplays by McG
Films about human sacrifice
2020s American films